Chrysochroa mniszechii is a species of beetle in the Buprestidae family, that can be found in Asia in countries such as Thailand.

Buprestidae
Beetles described in 1861